Freddie L. Boyd (born June 13, 1950) is a retired American National Basketball Association (NBA) player whose career lasted from 1972–1978.

He played in college for Oregon State University, and was drafted in the first round (5th overall) of the 1972 NBA draft by the Philadelphia 76ers.

Boyd played in 327 career games over six seasons for the 76ers and the New Orleans Jazz.

External links
 Freddie Boyd stats Database Basketball

1950 births
Living people
African-American basketball players
American men's basketball players
Basketball players from Bakersfield, California
New Orleans Jazz players
Oregon State Beavers men's basketball players
Philadelphia 76ers draft picks
Philadelphia 76ers players
Point guards
21st-century African-American people
20th-century African-American sportspeople